The Crooked River Light, also known as the Carrabelle Light, was built in 1895 to replace the Dog Island Light on Dog Island, which had been destroyed in 1875 by a hurricane. The location on the mainland allowed the light to serve as the rear range light for the channel to the west of Dog Island, used by ships in the lumber trade.

History

The Crooked River Lighthouse, built in 1895, replaced three lighthouses on Dog Island that over the years were destroyed by storms.  The lightstation grounds originally included a house for both the Keeper and the Assistant Keeper, and several outbuildings.  At first the lighthouse was painted solid dark red except for the black lantern room. Later (at the end of 1901) the lower half was painted white to offset it from the surrounding pine forest. This is the same daymark seen on the lighthouse today - the lower half white, the upper half red and a black lantern room.  After being electrified in 1933, the lighthouse was automated and unmanned in 1952.  In 1964 the two houses and all outbuildings were sold and removed from the site.  The original 4th Order lens was removed by the Coast Guard in 1976, due to mercury leakage in the float container.  The lens was replaced by a modern optic and this beacon remained in operation until the lighthouse was decommissioned in 1995.

In 1999 the Carrabelle Lighthouse Association was formed to restore, preserve, and open the lighthouse to the public.  This goal was achieved between 2007-2009.  An acrylic replica of the original glass Fresnel lens was installed and the lighthouse serves as an aid to navigation once again.

Head keepers
 James A. Williams (1895 – 1906)
 Albert A. Williams (1906 – 1912)
 Carl Wilson (1913)
 Jefferson D. Miller (1913 – 1918)
 Milton E. Wheelock (1919)
 Thorwald Hansen (at least 1921 – at least 1945)

See also

 List of lighthouses in Florida
 List of lighthouses in the United States

Notes

References

National Park Service Inventory of Historic Light Stations - Florida Lighthouses - accessed January 16, 2006
Florida Lighthouse Page - Crooked River Lighthouse History - accessed June 9, 2008
Crooked River Lighthouse - Carrabelle Lighthouse Association - accessed November 3, 2009
Crooked River Lighthouse - LighthouseFriends.com - accessed November 3, 2009
Crooked River Lighthouse - City of Carrabelle - accessed November 3, 2009
Photograph: "Sign: Crooked River Lighthouse History." - accessed November 14, 2010

External links

 Crooked River Lighthouse - Carrabelle Lighthouse Association

Lighthouses completed in 1895
Lighthouses on the National Register of Historic Places in Florida
Transportation buildings and structures in Franklin County, Florida
National Register of Historic Places in Franklin County, Florida
1895 establishments in Florida